Rahul Narwekar is an Indian politician and member of the Bharatiya Janata Party. He is the current speaker of Maharashtra Legislative Assembly. Narwekar was elected to the Maharashtra Legislative Council in June 2016 as a Governor's Nominated member. Previously, he was a member of the Shiv Sena party, but as the party denied him a ticket in 2014 Lok Sabha elections, he joined the Nationalist Congress Party and unsuccessfully contested the Lok Sabha election on the party's ticket from the Maval constituency. Rahul is the sitting MLA from Colaba (Vidhan Sabha constituency) in Mumbai on a Bhartiya Janata Party ticket. He is Speaker of Maharashtra Legislative Assembly on 3 July 2022 and he is the second-youngest (age 44) person to be elected speaker of any state in the country, the youngest being Shivraj Patil (age 42).

Personal life 
Rahul Narwekar is the son-in-law of senior NCP leader Ramraje Naik Nimbalkar. Rahul's father, Suresh Narwekar was a Municipal Councillor from the Colaba area. Rahul's brother Makarand Narwekar is a second-term Municipal Councillor, currently from Ward No. 227. Rahul's sister-in-law Harshita Narwekar is a Municipal Councillor from Ward No. 226.

References 

Living people
Members of the Maharashtra Legislative Council
Shiv Sena politicians
Nationalist Congress Party politicians from Maharashtra
Politicians from Mumbai
1970 births
Marathi politicians
Bharatiya Janata Party politicians from Maharashtra
Maharashtra MLAs 2019–2024